National Route 7, formerly called National Route 7A (QL7A) is a national highway in Vietnam which runs entirely in Nghệ An Province, North Central Vietnam. The 225 kilometer-long route runs from Diễn Châu (Diễn Châu District) northwestward across Yên Thành, Đô Lương, Anh Sơn, Con Cuông, Tương Dương, and Kỳ Sơn districts and reach the Laos-Vietnam border at Nậm Cắn. In Nậm Cắn, National Route 7 connects with National Route 7 of Laos.

The last segment from Đô Lương to Nậm Cắn runs through Western Nghe An biosphere reserve including a part of Annamite Range.

7
Nghệ An province